is a Japanese professional footballer who plays as a forward or right-back for Tochigi SC.

Club career
Yano was born in Hamamatsu, Shizuoka. He was chosen as one of the Designated Players for Development by J.League and JFA in 2002 when he was a student of Hamana High School. Because of this status, Yano was able to register as a Júbilo Iwata player while he was still eligible to play for his high school club. However, he did not play any official match for Iwata.

After graduating from his high school, he joined J1 League side Kashiwa Reysol. He played as substitute forward from first season. Although his opportunity to play increased late from summer 2005, Reysol was relegated to J2 League end of 2005 season.

In 2006, Yano was transferred to Albirex Niigata with teammate Mitsuru Nagata. He quickly established himself as a first-choice forward. Although his play style was a tall center forward, he was converted to right winger of three forwards in 2009 because Niigata gain same style forward Hideo Oshima.

In August 2010, Yano was transferred to Bundesliga club SC Freiburg. After an unsuccessful stint in Europe, he returned to Japan and signed for Niigata in February 2012. Although he initially played as regular forward, he lost his position and he played many matches as substitute forward from June. The club results were also sluggish and finished at the 15th place of 18 clubs in 2012 season.

In 2013, Yano moved to Nagoya Grampus. Although he initially played as center forward instead Joshua Kennedy who was injured, Kennedy came back in May and Yano played many matches as substitute forward. In 2014, Yano was converted to right side back by new manager Akira Nishino and became a regular player as right side back. Although he played as regular player every season, Nagoya finished at the 16th place of 18 clubs in 2016 season and was relegated to J2 League.

In 2017, Yano re-joined Albirex Niigata for the first time in four years. Although he played many matches as right side back, Niigata was relegated to J2 end of 2017 season. He was returned to his original position forward by new manager Masakazu Suzuki in 2018.

International career
Yano represented Japan at several underage levels and was a member of the Japan U-17 team at the 2001 U-17 World Championship finals where he scored one goal.

He received his first cap for the Japan national team when he came on as a substitute on 24 March 2007 in a friendly against Peru. He was a member of the Japan team for the 2007 Asian Cup finals and played two games as a substitute. Yano's first international goal was an injury time winner against Switzerland on 11 September 2007 in a friendly played in Klagenfurt. In May 2010. he was selected for the 2010 World Cup. At the World Cup, he played once, coming on as a substitute against Cameroon. This match was his last out of 19 for Japan.

Career statistics

Club

International

Scores and results list Japan's goal tally first, score column indicates score after each Yano goal.

Honours
Japan
 Kirin Cup: 2008, 2009

References

External links
 
 
 Japan National Football Team Database
 
 
  
 Profile at Albirex Niigata

Living people
1984 births
Association football forwards
Association football fullbacks
Association football people from Shizuoka Prefecture
Japanese footballers
Japan youth international footballers
Japan international footballers
J1 League players
J2 League players
Bundesliga players
Kashiwa Reysol players
Albirex Niigata players
SC Freiburg players
Nagoya Grampus players
Tochigi SC players
2007 AFC Asian Cup players
2010 FIFA World Cup players
Japanese expatriate footballers
Expatriate footballers in Germany
Japanese expatriate sportspeople in Germany